Gianluca Ramazzotti (born 22 August 1970) is an Italian television and theater actor.

Biography 

He has attended the academy of Theater of Calabria, followed by other courses at Warsaw Theater, and in Paris at the Theatre du Soleil. It entered the Company of the Bagaglino, directed by Pier Francesco Pingitore, participating both to shows and to fiction series produced by the company.

Besides the experience of the Bagaglino, he played in the series Vivere and Un posto al sole, and in the television film Il Papa Buono, by Ricky Tognazzi.

He works also as radio host and dubber, in particular in the early-morning radiofictions of Radiodue.

As theater actor, he has interpreted the role of Bojetto in the musical comedy Rugantino.

He speaks fluently French, English and Spanish.

Filmography

Theater 

I Promessi Sposi un musical
Intrichi d’amore
La scuola delle mogli
Soldati a Inglostadt
Ifigenia in Aulide
A qualcuno piace caldo
La notte
Il gatto che scoprì l’America
La farina del diavolo
Scanzonatissimo Gran Casinò
Babbo Natale è uno Stronzo…
Dark! Tornerò prima di mezzanotte
Il Vantone
Lei
I tre processi
E Ballando Ballando
Il Decamerone
Il re muore
Rugantino
Se devi dire una bugia dilla grossa
Cyrano
Boeing-Boeing
Romolo & Remolo
La Donna in nero
Destinatario Sconosciuto
Il giro del mondo in 80 risate
Sempre meglio che lavorare (one man Show)
Il Mago di Oz
Un pezzo di pazzo
Prime donne alle primarie
Uomini all’80%
Va tutto storto!
E io pago!
Complici
Gabbia di matti
Destinatario sconosciuto (also director)
Va tutto storto
Un'ora senza televisione Director. Music by Gianluca Attanasio

Television 

Vivere
 Un posto al sole
Anni 60
Distretto di polizia
Giornalisti
La squadra
Tequila e Bonetti
Il Papa buono
Miconsenta 
Con le unghie e con i denti
Barbecue
Passaparola
Domani è un'altra truffa
Torte in faccia
Punto e a capo (guest)
E io pago!
Edizione Straordinaria (satirical TV news, Demo Mura)
Seven Show 2007
Vita da paparazzo
Gabbia di Matti

References

External links 
Official website

1970 births
21st-century Italian male actors
Living people
Male actors from Rome
Italian male film actors
Italian male television actors
Italian male radio actors
Italian male stage actors